Labor discrimination as defined by Kenneth Arrow is  “the valuation in the market place of personal characteristics of the worker that are unrelated to worker productivity”. It can be thus understood as the differentiation of workers based on characteristics such as color, race, origin, gender etc. that can be classified as factors that do not have a role in determining his or her productivity. There are multiple dimensions that need to be considered when discussing such discrimination. The most obvious is that the group discriminated against is paid less for identical jobs. This is known as wage discrimination and is the most prevalent form of discrimination. The attempt to combat such a form of discrimination can be seen in increasing equal pay legislation in different countries. Examples of this are  the Equal Pay Act (1970), Sex Discrimination Act (1975), and Employment Protection Act (1975), but the effectiveness of such legislation is subject to much debate. Secondly, that the level of unemployment for the disadvantaged group in general is higher than that of other groups that do not face such discrimination. Thirdly, there is discrimination based on the kind of jobs that they have access to, the discriminated group given preference for repetitive and menial tasks. This is known as employment discrimination, where an individual is excluded from a job that is worked on by a person with equal productivity. When this happens, the disadvantaged group is employed for a job he or she is over-qualified for, simply because the group does not have access to better paying jobs in par to their counterparts and are denied opportunities of recruitment and promotion. A general misconception prevails that discrimination is only practiced by the employer. This is not true. In addition to employer discrimination, customer discrimination can also exist in the market. Customers may prefer to transact with only a certain kind of people.

Neoclassical theories of discrimination

Under this section, we shall basically deal with labour discrimination under the neoclassical label which builds on the human capital theory. To deal with the problem of such discrimination, it becomes important to answer two basic questions (i) To what extent is there a difference in the employment structure of various group based on differences in education and training and in contrast, to what extent are similarly qualified individuals belonging to different groups unequally treated? (ii) If such discrimination, as suggested, does exist, what are the explanations that can be provided to justify these?

Consumer discrimination 

Customer discrimination is a manifestation of personal prejudice of consumers such that they prefer to trade with individuals belonging to a certain group over others. A prevalent fact states that customers do not like being served by minorities or women. For example, a white customer may like to be served by a white worker. This leads to two consequences (i) There is a reduction in the demand for good that are sold by African-American workers and (ii) If the cost of the product is P, the customer acts like he is paying P(1 + d), where Pd is the cost of discrimination. The fact that customer discrimination is still prevalent in the market leads to a number of consequences, one, that it leads to segregation of jobs such that minorities and women are segregated into jobs that do not require a high level of personal contact with customers and two, the decline in the manufacturing industry and a growth in the service sector will only aid in increasing the effects of this discrimination with a growth of jobs requiring face-to-face contact.

Statistical discrimination
Statistical discrimination is said to occur when an employer projects group characteristics upon an individual which leads to him or her being discriminated against in the employment market. In the process of selecting a suitable candidate for a job, the employer has access to only that information which defines the productivity of the individual such as education, training, experience, age etc. These although do play a role, are not perfect measurements of productivity. In such cases, the employer supplements such information with other information that is prominent of the group he or she belongs to, for example, one’s race and sex is easily identifiable from an interview. Thus, the employee may attach the characteristics of his/her race or sex to quantify or guess his productivity. This, thus, is a form of discrimination that arises not because of a deep-rooted personal prejudice that an employer holds against a prospective employee.
Consider an example to illustrate this: Women, on an average, tend to have a shorter career life than males do and thus, even if they possess equal qualification as men, they tend to be less valuable to the company. Now, a career minded woman with equal qualifications as a man may be disadvantaged when applying for a job, because the employer may take into consideration the prevalent characteristics of the average women when comparing the two applications. Hence, the career minded woman is discriminated against.
Statistical discrimination leads to a systematic preference of a worker over other individuals with the same characteristics, and leads to a situation where women or minorities equal to their counterparts in qualifications are paid less. The manifestation of the stigma is not due to personal preference but it has the same effects as if prejudice was present.

References

Employment discrimination